Richard Lion Russell (July 22, 1924 – November 21, 2015) was an American writer on finance.

Life and career
Russell was born in New York, the son of Hortense (Lion) Russell, a novelist, and Henry Harold Russell, a civil engineer. His family was Jewish. Russell was educated at Rutgers and received his BA at NYU. He flew as a combat bombardier on B-25 Mitchell bombers with the 12th Air Force during World War II.

He began publishing a newsletter called the Dow Theory Letters in 1958. The Letters covered his views on the stock market and the precious metal markets. After Russell's passing, the letters continue market coverage by associated analysts. In addition he frequently shared episodes in his life and thoughts about the world as he saw it, following the stock market since the 1950s.

Stock analyst Robert Prechter wrote in his 1997 book: “Russell has made many exceptional market calls. He recommended gold stocks in 1960, called the top of the great bull market in stocks in 1966 and announced the end of the great bear market in December 1974.”

In 1969 Russell devised the Primary Trend Index, composed of eight market indicators that he never publicly divulged—his own secret recipe. When his index outperformed an 89-day moving average, it was time to buy. When it underperformed the 89-day moving average, a bear market was at hand.

The Letters, published every three weeks (www.dowtheoryletters.com), cover the US stock market, foreign markets, bonds, precious metals, commodities, economics. During Russell's lifetime, the letters also contained comments and observations and his stock market philosophy. Russell also wrote daily entries (Richard's Remarks) about 4 times a week on his website. Russell started his career in finance through a series of articles in Barrons newspaper.  He published a book named The Dow Theory Today  in 1958, summing up his view of the Dow Theory. Russell has also been cited by Bob Prechter using the Elliott wave principle. Russell also produced chart books showing technical analysis and important events which occur each year. The chart books are further described on his website.

As of 2015, Dow Theory Letters was the longest-running service continuously written by one person in the business.

Russell died in La Jolla, California on November 21, 2015.

References

Writers from New York (state)
American finance and investment writers
Jewish American military personnel
2015 deaths
1924 births
Rutgers University alumni
New York University alumni
United States Air Force airmen
United States Army Air Forces personnel of World War II
21st-century American Jews